Valerie Gibson , also known as Val Gibson, is a Professor of Physics and Head of the High Energy Physics group at the University of Cambridge.

Education 
Gibson completed a Bachelors in Physics at the University of Sheffield in 1983. She achieved a DPhil in experimental particle physics in 1986 from The Queen's College, Oxford.

Career 
In 1987 she became a fellow in the Experimental Physics Division at CERN. She joined the Cavendish Laboratory in 1989 on a five-year SERC Advanced Fellowship. In 1989 she also received a Stokes Senior Research Fellowship at Pembroke College. She was appointed as University Lecturer and Fellow of Trinity College in 1994. She was awarded a Royal Society Leverhulme Trust Fellowship in 2007. Gibson was appointed Professor in 2009.

She began work on the Muon Scattering Experiment at Paul Scherrer Institute. She has worked on the LHCb experiment since the first beam of particles were injected into the Large Hadron Collider in 2008. Gibson has overall responsibility for data acquisition from the ring imaging Cherenkov detectors. Gibson was the UK spokesperson for the LHCb experiment between 2004 and 2008. Today she is chair of the LHCb Collaboration Board and lead of the University of Cambridge's LHCb team. Gibson was part of the discovery of CP violation in the Kaon system.

Public engagement 
Gibson is a keen science communicator, interested in taking science to a wider range of audiences. She regularly discusses particle physics discoveries in the media. She developed the card game Hunt the Higgs and has acted as an adviser for exhibitions at the Science Museum. She is a patron of the Gravity Fields Festival. Alongside her research group, Gibson exhibited at the Royal Society Summer Science Exhibition.

Gibson has spent her career championing women in science. She believes it is her duty "to encourage younger women in their careers and say ‘it is possible’". She has been part of the University of Cambridge's Athena SWAN and Project Juno committees. In 2014, the University of Cambridge were awarded the first gold Athena SWAN award. She won the WISE Campaign Leader Award in 2013. She is chair of the Institute of Physics Juno panel. In 2016 she launched a three-day residential program for young women interested in physics at the Cavendish Laboratory. In 2016 she won a Royal Society Athena Prize for increasing gender diversity in mathematics, having been nominated by the Institute of Physics. She was a keynote speaker at the 2018 Conference for Undergraduate Women in Physics.

Gibson was appointed Officer of the Order of the British Empire (OBE) in the 2021 New Year Honours for services to science, women in science and public engagement.

References 

Particle physicists
Alumni of the University of Oxford
Fellows of Trinity College, Cambridge
British women physicists
Alumni of the University of Sheffield
20th-century British physicists
20th-century British women scientists
21st-century British physicists
21st-century British women scientists
People associated with CERN
People educated at Kesteven and Grantham Girls' School
People from Grantham
Officers of the Order of the British Empire